National Movement of Servants of the Masses is a political party in Senegal, founded on March 12, 1998 in Diourbel. The party is led by Aliou Seck.

References

Political parties in Senegal